Jerome Leon Bruckheimer (born September 21, 1943) is an American film and television producer. He has been active in the genres of action, drama, fantasy, and science fiction.

His films include Flashdance, Top Gun, The Rock, Crimson Tide, Con Air, Armageddon, Enemy of the State, Black Hawk Down, Pearl Harbor, Kangaroo Jack, and the Beverly Hills Cop, Bad Boys, Pirates of the Caribbean, and the National Treasure franchises. Many of his films have been co-produced by Paramount and Disney, while many of his television series have been co-produced by Warner Bros. and CBS Studios. In July 2003, Bruckheimer was honored by Variety as the first producer in Hollywood history to produce the top two highest-grossing films of a single weekend, Pirates of the Caribbean: The Curse of the Black Pearl and Bad Boys II. In 2023, Top Gun: Maverick earned him a nomination for the Academy Award for Best Picture.

His best known television series are CSI: Crime Scene Investigation, CSI: Miami, CSI: NY, CSI: Cyber, Without a Trace, Cold Case, and the American version of The Amazing Race. For the lattermost, he won ten Primetime Emmy Awards. At one point, three of his TV series ranked among the top 10 in the U.S. ratings—a unique feat in television.

He is also the co-founder and co-majority owner (along with David Bonderman) of the Seattle Kraken, the 2021 expansion team of the National Hockey League.

Biography

Early life 

Bruckheimer was born in Detroit, the son of German Jewish immigrants. He graduated from Mumford High School in 1961 in Detroit, at age 17, before moving to Arizona for college. Bruckheimer was also an active member of the Stamp Collecting Club. He graduated with a degree in psychology from the University of Arizona. He was a member of the Zeta Beta Tau fraternity. A film buff at an early age with an interest in photography, Bruckheimer would take snapshots when he had the opportunity. After college, Bruckheimer worked in advertising in Detroit (creative producer) and New York City. At the Detroit agency he worked on a one minute ad spot for the new Pontiac GTO. Early in his career, Bruckheimer produced television commercials, including one for Pepsi.

1970s & 1980s: From advertising to film production 
Bruckheimer started producing films in the 1970s after leaving his job in advertising, with director Dick Richards. They worked together on the films The Culpepper Cattle Company, Farewell, My Lovely, and March or Die. Bruckheimer then worked with Paul Schrader on two films, American Gigolo and Cat People, which began to give him notice in Hollywood.

During the 1980s and 1990s, he was a co-producer with Don Simpson of a string of highly successful films for Paramount Pictures. He first met Simpson at a screening of 1973's The Harder They Come at Warner Brothers. The two worked together and created Bruckheimer's first big hit, 1983's Flashdance, which brought in $95 million. He had a number of other hits during that time period, including the Beverly Hills Cop films, Top Gun, and Days of Thunder. Top Gun marked his first collaboration with English director Tony Scott, who directed six films for Bruckheimer. The first Beverly Hills Cop movie, which was supposed to star Sylvester Stallone, launched Eddie Murphy's career and in just five days, became the highest grossing winter release in Paramount's history. On August 9, 1983, Bruckheimer and Simpson struck a three-year agreement with Paramount to produce theatrical and television projects through his new Simpson/Bruckheimer Productions company.

While working with Simpson, Bruckheimer became known as "Mr. Outside" because of his experience with filmmaking, while Simpson became known as "Mr. Inside" because of his film industry contacts. The Rock was the last film in which Bruckheimer collaborated with Simpson. After Simpson's death in 1996, Bruckheimer stipulated that The Rock be dedicated to the memory of Simpson.

1990s: Big-budget films 

In 1990, Bruckheimer and Simpson struck a $500 million deal with Paramount to produce five movies, entirely of their choice. However, his 1990 production of the film Days of Thunder, which starred Tom Cruise, did not perform as well as expected, which was a step backwards in the Bruckheimer-Simpson success story. The duo made a come-back in 1994, however, with the low-budget film ($12 million) The Ref.

Despite Simpson's untimely death, Bruckheimer continued to produce a large number of action films, often working with director Michael Bay on several box office hits, including Armageddon. Other popular films he produced include Remember the Titans, Black Hawk Down, and the Pirates of the Caribbean series. Bruckheimer has also acquired the rights to produce a film based on the popular role playing game by Palladium Books, Rifts. In the late 1990s, he started Technical Black Films to produce non-action films, with Remember the Titans being the only film produced.

2000s: Franchises, TV, video games 

Since 1996, Bruckheimer has branched out into television, creating a number of police dramas of which CSI: Crime Scene Investigation has been the most successful. He also produced the reality game show The Amazing Race. In May 2008, CBS announced it had picked up Bruckheimer's newest series, Eleventh Hour, for the 2008–2009 broadcast television season. The science fiction drama follows a government agent and a professor as they investigate strange scientific and medical activity.

From 2004 (beginning of CSI: NY) to 2009 (end of Without a Trace), Bruckheimer had six hit television shows on the air: CSI: Crime Scene Investigation, CSI: Miami, CSI: NY, Cold Case, Without a Trace and The Amazing Race. At one point, three of his TV series ranked among the top 10 in the ratings.

In December 2007, Bruckheimer announced plans to partner with MTV to create a new game studio. The same year, Bruckheimer joined the ZeniMax Media board of directors and has since showed up at several launch parties for Bethesda Softworks titles, including Fallout 3, Fallout: New Vegas, and The Elder Scrolls V: Skyrim. In 2009, Bruckheimer unveiled Jerry Bruckheimer Games, headed by former Microsoft Studios Publishing Executive Producer Jim Veevaert, as President of Production, and Jay Cohen, previously Ubisoft's Vice President of US Publishing, as President of Development.

It was announced on September 10, 2009, that NBC had picked up an action procedural from Bruckheimer. The show, titled Chase, "tells the stories of a team charged with making sure fugitive criminals don't evade justice," reports The Hollywood Reporter. It was canceled in May 2011, however. Skin, which was another Bruckheiner production, was cancelled in 2003, after only three episodes.

2010s: Independent producer, sports 
In 2011, it was rumored that Jerry Bruckheimer Games was working on three titles, but nothing came to fruition. In March 2013, Jerry Bruckheimer Games was closed. Although Jerry Bruckheimer Games is closed, Bruckheimer still remained a ZeniMax Board Member, mostly due to being a close associate of former ZeniMax President Ernest Del, until ZeniMax was purchased by Microsoft in 2021.

In 2014, after the disappointment of The Sorcerer's Apprentice and The Lone Ranger, Bruckheimer and the Disney Studios chose to part ways by not renewing their first-look deal that expired that year. He signed a new first-look deal with Paramount that same year and mentioned a new Beverly Hills Cop and a Top Gun 2 as potential production ventures with his new partner.

In June 2016, Jerry Bruckheimer Television became an independent outfit, ending a 15-year run exclusive pact with Warner Bros Television. The next year, the production company signed a deal with CBS Television Studios.

Bruckheimer was named as one of the investors of a proposed sports arena in Las Vegas, and he had been rumored to be the leading choice by the National Hockey League (NHL) to own an expansion hockey team that would play in the arena. Bruckheimer was also named as one of the investors of a proposed Seattle-based NHL expansion team, whose application was submitted in early 2018. The NHL Board of Governors voted to approve the team, named the Seattle Kraken, on December 4, 2018, which started to play in the 2021–22 season. Bruckheimer was part of an investment group that also included Tim Leiweke (Oak View Group) and David Bonderman (minority owner NBA's Boston Celtics). In 2020, it was reported that his first look deal with Paramount was not renewed.

Impact on the film industry

High-profit productions 

The movie Top Gun was produced in collaboration with the Pentagon to rebrand the US Navy's image after the Vietnam War and attract new Navy recruits. Top Gun was the first full-blown collaboration between Hollywood and the Navy. The model, which was developed by Bruckheimer, launched a new trend of military movies in the 1990s and onward.

In July 2003, Bruckheimer was honored by Variety as the first producer in Hollywood history to produce the top two highest-grossing films of a single weekend, the buddy-cop Bad Boys II and the Disney theme-park spin-off, Pirates of the Caribbean: The Curse of the Black Pearl. According to Variety, the "Bruckheimer touch" is characterized by a "consistently edgy, high-octane visual dynamic and equally distinctive storytelling driven by the triumphalism so popular with Madison Avenue".

The Pirates of the Caribbean film series, produced through Walt Disney Pictures, was enormously profitable and demonstrated Bruckheimer's ability to create lucrative projects. Pirates of the Caribbean: The Curse of the Black Pearl, which was the first film in the franchise, was released on July 9, 2003. A box office hit, the film was well received by both critics and filmgoers. After the unexpected success of the first film, Disney revealed that a trilogy was in the works. Pirates of the Caribbean: Dead Man's Chest was released on July 7, 2006. The sequel proved to be very successful, breaking records worldwide on the day of its premiere. In the end, the film acquired a total of $1,066,179,725 at the worldwide box office, becoming the third and fastest film to reach this amount. The third film in the series, Pirates of the Caribbean: At World's End, was released worldwide on May 25, 2007. Two more films, Pirates of the Caribbean: On Stranger Tides and Pirates of the Caribbean: Dead Men Tell No Tales, were released, in 2011 and 2017, respectively. Altogether, the film franchise has grossed over $4.5 billion worldwide.

Views on moviemaking 

When asked on what the film industry's obligation to an audience was, he responded, "We are in the transportation business. We transport audiences from one place to another." When asked why he makes films, he stated, "If I made films for the critics, or for someone else, I'd probably be living in some small Hollywood studio apartment."

In a 1984 interview with the Los Angeles Times, Bruckheimer said, "We [he and Don Simpson] put together all the elements. We decide what aesthetic is right for a picture. We are as much a part of the process as the director."

Personal life

Bruckheimer has been married twice. His first wife was Bonnie Fishman Bruckheimer. As of 2006, he resides in Los Angeles with his second wife, novelist Linda Cobb Bruckheimer. He has one stepdaughter, Alexandra.

When asked about his favorite films, Bruckheimer named The Godfather (1972), The French Connection (1971), Good Will Hunting (1997), and The 400 Blows (1959). 

In May 2006, he was honored with a Doctorate of Fine Arts degree (DFA) from the University of Arizona's College of Fine Arts.

Philanthropic activities 

Bruckheimer's philanthropic activities have included publicly supporting the fight against multiple sclerosis via his work with The Nancy Davis Foundation for MS. Additionally, throughout his career, he has pledged to help various causes by establishing the Jerry Bruckheimer Foundation. According to The Smoking Gun, however, the last time the Jerry Bruckheimer Foundation made a contribution was in 1995, when it gave $9,350 to Van Nuys Prep School.

Bruckheimer has aided in the repair and restoration of the historic clipper ship, Cutty Sark. A collection of photos taken by Bruckheimer went on display in London in November 2007 to help raise money for the Cutty Sark Conservation Project. The exhibition featured more than thirty pictures taken on set during the filming of Pirates of the Caribbean: At World's End.

Political contributions 

Bruckheimer has donated more than $50,000 to Republican campaigns and committees. He donated funds to John McCain's 2008 presidential election campaign. He gave $5,000 to a joint fundraising committee on John McCain's behalf. He donated $25,000 to the 2012 Mitt Romney Victory Fund.

Filmography 
All films were produced by him, unless otherwise noted.

Film 
As producer, except where noted:

Paramount Pictures

Walt Disney Studios Motion Pictures

Sony Pictures Releasing

Warner Bros.

Others

Television 
Co-producer

Executive producer

Honors and awards 

 1998: ShoWest Producer of the Year Award
 2000: Producers Guild of America
 2000: David O. Selznick Award for Lifetime Achievement
 2003: " No. 1 most-powerful person in Hollywood" by Entertainment Weekly
 2003–2009, 2011–2012, 2014: Primetime Emmy Award for Outstanding Reality Competition Program for The Amazing Race
 2006: #10 on Premiere's "Power 50" list
 2013: Star on the Hollywood Walk of Fame, placed right by El Capitan Theatre on Hollywood Boulevard.

His productions collected the following:
 Academy Award: 48 nominations, 7 wins
 Grammy Award: 8 nominations, 5 wins
 Golden Globe: 23 nominations, 4 wins
 Emmy Award: 77 nominations, 17 wins
 People's Choice Awards: 8 nominations, 4 wins

References

External links
 
 Jerry Bruckheimer Films
 
 
 ZeniMax Media Inc.

1943 births
Living people
Skydance Media people
American entertainment industry businesspeople
Film producers from California
American people of German-Jewish descent
American sports businesspeople
National Hockey League owners
Television producers from California
California Republicans
Primetime Emmy Award winners
Businesspeople from Detroit
Businesspeople from Los Angeles
University of Arizona alumni
American reality television producers
Film producers from Michigan
Film producers from Arizona
Seattle Kraken owners
Mumford High School alumni
Jewish American television producers
Jewish American film producers